Xiao'erjing or Xiao'erjin or Xiaor jin or in its shortened form, Xiaojing, literally meaning "children's script" or "minor script" (cf. It is used on occasion by many ethnic minorities who adhere to the Islamic faith in China (mostly the Hui, but also the Dongxiang and the Salar) and formerly by their Dungan descendants in Central Asia. Orthography reforms introduced the Latin script and later the Cyrillic script to the Dungan language, which continue to be used today.

Xiao'erjing is written from right to left, like other writing systems using the Perso-Arabic script. The Xiao'erjing writing system is unusual among Arabic script-based writing systems in that all vowels, long and short, are explicitly marked at all times with Arabic diacritics; this means that Xiao'erjing is technically an alphabet, in contrast to the abjad classification of most Perso-Arabic script varieties. This is also in contrast to some other Arabic-based writing systems in China, such as the Uyghur Ereb Yéziqi, which uses full letters and not diacritics to mark short vowels.

Nomenclature 
Xiao'erjing does not have a single, standard name. The Dongxiang people refer to it as the "Dongxiang script" or the "Huihui script"; The Salar refer to it as the "Salar script"; The Dungan of Central Asia used a variation of Xiao'erjing called the "Hui script", before being made to abandon the Arabic script for Latin and Cyrillic. According to A. Kalimov, a  famous Dungan linguist, the Dungan of the former Soviet Union called this script .

Origins 
Since the arrival of Islam during the Tang Dynasty (beginning in the mid-7th century), many Arabic or Persian speaking people migrated into China. Centuries later, these peoples assimilated with the native Han Chinese, forming the Hui ethnicity of today. Many Chinese Muslim students attended madrasas to study Classical Arabic and the Qur'an. Because these students had a very basic understanding of Chinese characters but would have a better command of the spoken tongue once assimilated, they started using the Arabic script for Chinese. This was often done by writing notes in Chinese to aid in the memorization of surahs. This method was also used to write Chinese translations of Arabic vocabulary learned in the madrasas. Thus, a system of writing the Chinese language with Arabic script gradually developed and standardized to some extent. The stele shows inscribed Qur'anic verses in Arabic as well as a short note of the names of the inscribers in Xiao'erjing. The stele was done in the year AH 740 in the Islamic calendar (between July 9, 1339, and June 26, 1340). Some old Xiao'erjing manuscripts (along with other rare texts including those from Dunhuang) are preserved in the Institute of Oriental Manuscripts of the Russian Academy of Sciences in St. Petersburg, Russia.

Usage 
Xiao'erjing can be divided into two sets, the "Mosque system" and the "Daily system". The "Mosque system" is the system used by pupils and imams in mosques and madrasahs. It contains much Arabic and Persian religious lexicon, and no usage of Chinese characters. This system is relatively standardised, and could be considered a true writing system. The "Daily system" is the system used by the less educated for letters and correspondences on a personal level. Often simple Chinese characters are mixed in with the Arabic script, mostly discussing non-religious matters, and therewith relatively little Arabic and Persian loans. This practice can differ drastically from person to person. The system would be devised by the writer himself, with one's own understanding of the Arabic and Persian alphabets, mapped accordingly to one's own dialectal pronunciation. Often, only the letter's sender and the letter's receiver can understand completely what is written, while being very difficult for others to read. Unlike Hui Muslims in other areas of China, Muslims of the northwest provinces of Shaanxi and Gansu had no knowledge of the Han Kitab or Classical Chinese, they used Xiao'erjing. Xiao'erjing was used to annotate in Chinese, foreign language Islamic documents in languages like Persian.

Xiao'erjing was used mostly by Muslims who could not read Chinese characters. It was imperfect due to various factors. The differing Chinese dialects would require multiple different depictions with Xiao'erjing. Xiao'erjing cannot display the tones present in Chinese, syllable endings are indistinguishable, i.e. xi'an and xian. Xiao'erjing was much simpler than Chinese characters for representing Chinese.

Modern usage 
In recent years, the usage of Xiao'erjing is nearing extinction due to the growing economy of the People's Republic of China and the improvement of the education of Chinese characters in rural areas of China. Chinese characters along with Hanyu Pinyin have since replaced Xiao'erjing. Since the mid-1980s, there has been much scholarly work done within and outside China concerning Xiao'erjing. On-location research has been conducted and the users of Xiao'erjing have been interviewed. Written and printed materials of Xiao'erjing were also collected by researchers, the ones at Nanjing University being the most comprehensive.  is leading a project in Japan concerning Xiao'erjing. Books are printed in Xiao'erjing. In Arabic language Qur'ans, Xiao'erjing annotations are used to help women read. Xiao'erjing is used to explain certain terms when used as annotations. Xiao'erjing is also used to write Chinese language Qurans.

A Dachang Hui Imam, Ma Zhenwu, wrote a Qur'an translation into Chinese including Chinese characters and Xiao'erjing.

Alphabet 
Xiao'erjing has 36 letters, 4 of which are used to represent vowel sounds. The 36 letters consists of 28 letters borrowed from Arabic, 4 letters borrowed from Persian along with 2 modified letters and 4 extra letters unique to Xiao'erjing.

Initials and consonants

Finals and vowels 

Vowels in Arabic and Persian loans follow their respective orthographies, namely, only the long vowels are represented and the short vowels are omitted.
Although the sukun can be omitted when representing Arabic and Persian loans, it cannot be omitted when representing Chinese. The exception being that of oft-used monosyllabic words which can have the sukun omitted from writing.
This is sometimes replaced by the fatḥatan, the kasratan, or the dammatan.
In polysyllabic words, the final 'alif that represents the long vowel -ā can be omitted and replaced by a fatḥah representing the short vowel -ă.
Xiao'erjing is similar to Hanyu Pinyin in the respect that words are written as one, while a space is inserted between words.
When representing Chinese words, the shaddah sign represents a doubling of the entire syllable on which it rests. It has the same function as the Chinese iteration mark "々".
Arabic punctuation marks can be used with Xiao'erjing as can Chinese punctuation marks, they can also be mixed (Chinese pauses and periods with Arabic commas and quotation marks).

Example 
Article 1 of the Universal Declaration of Human Rights in Xiao'erjing, simplified and traditional Chinese characters, Hanyu Pinyin and English:

Xiao'erjing (image) 

Xiao'erjing (Unicode) 

 Simplified Chinese 

 Traditional Chinese 

 Bopomofo 

 Pinyin 

 Wade–Giles 

 English "All human beings are born free and equal in dignity and rights. They are endowed with reason and conscience and should act toward one another in a spirit of brotherhood."

See also 
 :Category:Arabic alphabets
 Islam in China
 Sini (script)
 Jawi alphabet
 Aljamiado
 Arebica
 Uyghur Arabic alphabet

References

Citations

Sources 

 A. Forke. Ein islamisches Tractat  aus Turkistan // T’oung pao. Vol. VIII. 1907.
 O.I. Zavyalova. Sino-Islamic language contacts along the Great Silk Road: Chinese texts written in Arabic Script // Chinese Studies (《漢學研究》).  Taipei: 1999.  No. 1.
 Xiaojing Qur'an (《小經古蘭》), Dongxiang County, Lingxia Hui Autonomous Prefecture, Gansu, PRC, 1987.
 Huijiao Bizun (Xiaojing) (《回教必遵（小經）》), Islam Book Publishers, Xi'an, Shaanxi, PRC, 1993, 154 pp., photocopied edition.
 Muhammad Musa Abdulihakim. Islamic faith Q&A (《伊斯兰信仰问答》) (2nd ed.). Beiguan Street Mosque, Xining, Qinghai, PRC, appendix contains a Xiao'erjing–Pinyin–Arabic comparison chart.
 Feng Zenglie. Beginning Dissertation on Xiao'erjing: Introducing a phonetic writing system of the Arabic script adopted for Chinese in The Arab World (《阿拉伯世界》) Issue #1. 1982.
 Chen Yuanlong. The Xiaojing writing system of the Dongxiang ethnicity in China's Dongxiang ethnicity (《中国东乡族》). People's Publishing House of Gansu. 1999.

External links 
 Tokyo University of Foreign Studies Xiao-Er-Jin Corpus Collection and Digitization Project
 Xiao’erjin is not quite Pinyin – a blog about Xiao'erjing and related issues
Chinese Pinyin to Xiao'erjing Online Conversion Tool

Arabic alphabets
Transcription of Chinese
Chinese words and phrases